Walterhall is a rural locality in the Rockhampton Region, Queensland, Australia.

Geography 
The Burnett Highway passes to the east.

History 
The locality takes its name from the Walter Hall railway station, which was named on 26 November 1898 after businessman Walter Russell Hall, who was a major shareholder in the Mount Morgan Gold Mining Company Limited.

Walterhall State School opened on 9 July 1917 and closed on 31 December 1969.

Education 
There are no schools in Walterhall. The nearest government primary and secondary schools are Mount Morgan State School and Mount Morgan State High School, both in neighbouring Mount Morgan to the south-east.

References 

Suburbs of Rockhampton Region
Localities in Queensland